Niederrickenbach Station railway station is a Swiss railway station in the municipality of Wolfenschiessen in the canton of Nidwalden. It is on the Luzern–Stans–Engelberg line, owned by the Zentralbahn railway company. The station is adjacent to the lower station of the cable car, to the hamlet of Niederrickenbach and the convent of Maria-Rickenbach, from which it takes its name.

Niederrickenbach station is  horizontally and  vertically from Niederrickenbach hamlet. Unusually, and perhaps for this reason, the German language railway timetable includes the word Station as part of the name of this railway station. Because of the distance the station was made a request stop.

Services 
The following services stop at Niederrickenbach Station:

The station is also served by the cable car to the hamlet of Niederrickenbach and the convent of Maria-Rickenbach, which operates every half-hour.

See also 
 Thörishaus Station railway station

References

External links 
 

Railway stations in the canton of Nidwalden
Wolfenschiessen
Zentralbahn stations